The Euro Players Tour Championship 2010/2011 – Event 6 (also known as the 2010 Prague Classic) was a professional minor-ranking snooker tournament that took place between 19–21 November 2010 at the Aréna Sparta Podvinný Mlýn in Prague, Czech Republic.

Rory McLeod made the 76th official maximum break during his last 32 match against Issara Kachaiwong. This was McLeod's first 147 break.

Michael Holt won the final 4–3 against John Higgins.

Prize fund and ranking points
The breakdown of prize money and ranking points of the event is shown below:

1 Only professional players can earn ranking points.
2 Prize money earned from the Plate competition does not qualify for inclusion in the Order of Merit.

Main draw

Top half

Section 1

Section 2

Section 3

Section 4

Bottom half

Section 5

Section 6

Section 7

Section 8

Finals

Century breaks

 147  Rory McLeod
 136, 117, 106  Ryan Day
 135, 116  Joe Perry
 132, 120, 100  Mark Allen
 132  Joe Jogia
 132  Mark Selby
 127, 107  Anthony McGill
 123  Liam Highfield
 122  Adrian Gunnell
 121  Peter Ebdon
 121  Barry Pinches
 120  Matthew Stevens
 119, 104  Jack Lisowski
 117, 105  Graeme Dott
 117  Mark Davis
 115, 111  Jimmy Robertson

 114, 109  Ricky Walden
 113, 102  Shaun Murphy
 113  Gerard Greene
 112, 104, 102, 101, 100  John Higgins
 111, 108  Stuart Bingham
 110, 101  Andy Hicks
 109  Jamie Burnett
 108, 101  Michael Holt
 105  Dominic Dale
 105  Robert Milkins
 104  Daniel Wells
 103  Michael White
 102  Judd Trump
 102  Stephen Maguire
 102  Ken Doherty
 100  Liu Chuang

References

6 Euro
2010 in Czech sport

sv:Euro Players Tour Championship 2010/2011#Euro Players Tour Championship 6